Tadg mac Ruaidrí Ua Conchobair (died 1097) was King of Connacht.

Tadg was a senior son of Ruaidrí na Saide Buide, who was deposed in 1092 by Flaithbertaigh Ua Flaithbertaigh. The succession became confused, with O'Hynes of Aidhne been made king by Ua Flaithbertaigh. However, by 1097, Tadg had ascended to the kingship only to be killed by Domnall mac Tigernáin Ua Ruairc.

References

 West or H-Iar Connaught Ruaidhrí Ó Flaithbheartaigh, 1684 (published 1846, ed. James Hardiman).
 Origin of the Surname O'Flaherty, Anthony Matthews, Dublin, 1968, p. 40.
 Irish Kings and High-Kings, Francis John Byrne (2001), Dublin: Four Courts Press, 
 Annals of Ulster at CELT: Corpus of Electronic Texts at University College Cork
 Byrne, Francis John (2001), Irish Kings and High-Kings, Dublin: Four Courts Press, 

People from County Galway
11th-century Irish monarchs
1097 deaths
Tadg
Year of birth unknown